Tatyana Ivanovna Koryagina (10 July 1943 – 6 September 2022) was a Russian economist and politician.

Koryagina died on 6 September 2022, at the age of 80.

References

1943 births
2022 deaths
Russian politicians
Russian economists
Russian women
People from Zelenograd
20th-century Russian women
21st-century Russian women